The 2019 Ottawa Fury FC season was the club's 6th and final season at the professional level and its 3rd and final in the USL Championship before suspending operations.

Current roster

Transfers

In

Out

Loan In

Competitions

Preseason
Preseason scheduled announced on January 28, 2019.

USL Championship

Eastern Conference standings

Results summary

Results by round

Match reports
Schedule announced on January 3, 2019.

USL Cup Playoffs

Canadian Championship

Third qualifying round

Semi-finals

Statistics

Appearances and goals

|}

Disciplinary record

Clean sheets

References

Ottawa Fury
Ottawa Fury
2019
Ottawa Fury
2010s in Ottawa